The name Cimaron has been used to name four tropical cyclones in the northwestern Pacific Ocean. The name was submitted by the Philippines and refers to a type of wild ox.
 Severe Tropical Storm Cimaron (2001) (T0101, 03W, Crising) – brushed the Philippines and Taiwan
 Typhoon Cimaron (2006) (T0619, 22W, Paeng) – affected the Philippines, causing several deaths
 Tropical Storm Cimaron (2013) (T1308, 08W, Isang) – struck the Philippines and China.
Typhoon Cimaron (2018) (T1820, 23W) – struck Japan.

Pacific typhoon set index articles